The Government of United Republic of Tanzania has enacted four Acts concerning with the control of freedom and regulation of media in the country. These are The Cybercrimes Act, 2015, The Statistics Act, 2015,  The Media Services Act, 2016, and The Access to Information Act, 2015.  The Government of the Republic of Tanzania on one side claims that the four Acts were highly needed to facilitate access to information and control the media sector. Political analysts, activists and normal people on the other side criticized that the Acts will pessimistically affect the freedom of media and eventually the freedom of speech of citizens. The Acts give the Minister responsible for information the power to ban any media which may seems to report, publish, print or broadcast information contrary to the code of conducts or threaten peace in the state.

Brief history 
The Media Services Act, 2016, was enacted in 2016 by the parliament of the united republic of Tanzania on 5 November 2016 and signed by President John Pombe Magufuli just two weeks later. The Act replaced the then restrictive Newspaper Act of 1976. The Expectation to many people was that, the Act would to become an updated media law that will obey to international conventions like United Nation Declaration of Human rights (UNDHR), East African Community Treaty  and others on citizen liberty to access information but unexpectedly the Acts seems to many as depriving of civil constitutional rights like freedom of expression and freedom of getting information.

Reaction from press 
The Media Council of Tanzania (MCT), Legal and Human Right Centre (LHRC), and Tanzania Human Rights Defenders Coalition HRDC) on 11 January 2017 filed a petition at the East African Court of Justice (EACJ) to challenge the newly passed Media Service Act, 2016. The team of lawyers from MCT, LHRC and THRDC are challenging sections of the Media Services Act, 2016 which appeared to deprive the civil liberties to access and getting information. According to the constitution of Tanzania Article 18 (a), (b), (c) and (d) Some deprived constitutional civil rights by the Media service Acts are;
 Freedom of opinion and expression ideas
 Right to seek, receive and, or disseminate information regardless of national boundaries;
 Freedom to communicate and a freedom with protection from interference
 Right to be informed at all times of various important events of life and activities of the people and also of issues of importance to the society

East African Court of Justice decision

March 2019 delivered the judgement and ruled that some of the provisions of sections 7(3) (a), (b), (c), (f), (g), (h), (i) and (j) and section 19, 20, 21, 35, 36, 37, 38, 39, 40, 50, 52, 53, 54, 58 and 59 of the Media Services Act are in violation of the Articles 6(d), 7(2) and 8(1) of the Treaty for the Establishment of the East African Community..

References 

Law of Tanzania